"Get Up and Boogie" is a song by German disco act Silver Convention from their 1976 second album of the same name. The song was written and composed by Sylvester Levay and Stephan Prager, and produced by Prager. The song was released as the lead single from the album Get Up and Boogie (also titled Silver Convention in some countries) in 1976.

Composition
Similar to their previous 1975 hit single "Fly, Robin, Fly", the lyrics of "Get Up and Boogie" consists only of two phrases, "Get up and boogie!" and "That's right!" repeated throughout the song.

Reception
"Get Up and Boogie" hit number one on June 15, 1976 in Canada, and reached No. 2 on the U.S. Billboard Hot 100, being kept off the No. 1 spot by Wings' "Silly Love Songs". Billboard ranked it as the #24 song for 1976. "Get Up and Boogie" also became a hit during the late-1970s disco scene.

Covers and samples

 Australian rock band Regurgitator sampled the "That's right!" vocal line from "Get Up and Boogie" in their 1998 song "! (The Song Formerly Known As)".
 In the late 2000s, the song was retooled as "Get Up and Snuggie" for use in commercials advertising the "Snuggie" (sleeved blanket).
 A cover of the song appeared on one edition of Static-X's 2007 album Cannibal.

Charts

Weekly charts

Year-end charts

All-time charts

References

External links
 Lyrics of this song
 

Disco songs
1976 songs
1976 singles
Cashbox number-one singles
RPM Top Singles number-one singles
Silver Convention songs
Songs with lyrics by Michael Kunze
Songs with music by Sylvester Levay
Songs about dancing